The Dig Out Your Soul Tour was the final world concert tour by English rock band Oasis, in support of their album Dig Out Your Soul. The tour started in Seattle, Washington at the WaMu Theater on 26 August 2008 and was planned to continue until 30 August 2009, where they were scheduled to play their final show of the tour at the I-Day Festival in Milan, Italy. However, on 28 August 2009, after a fight between the Gallaghers in the backstage, their manager announced the cancellation of their concert at the Rock-en-Seine festival near Paris just minutes before it was about to begin, the cancellation of the European tour and that the group "does not exist anymore", referring a coming statement from Noel Gallagher.

Two hours later, a little before midnight, on the band website, a statement of Noel Gallagher read: "It's with some sadness and great relief to tell you that I quit Oasis tonight. People will write and say what they like, but I simply could not go on working with Liam a day longer. Apologies to all the people who bought tickets for the shows in Paris, Konstanz and Milan."

Background
Before the band embarked on the tour, songwriter/guitarist Noel Gallagher jokingly said he considered outplaying The Rolling Stones' A Bigger Bang Tour, which was the highest-grossing tour of all time with $558 million earned, and lasted over two years. He fell back to minimising it to a year and a half, citing exhaustion as a reason.

The band played a special show for fans in their rehearsal studio on 14 August 2008. The setlist included some of their oldest tunes, but surprisingly included a track from Be Here Now, "My Big Mouth". The band rarely played any of the album's songs live, other than special occasions and acoustic sessions. Several songs from the band, including "Gas Panic!", "The Turning", and "Bag It Up", as well as new songs such as "Everybody's on the Run", "If I Had a Gun...", "Stop the Clocks", and "A Simple Game of Genius", all of which would later be recorded for Noel's solo project, Noel Gallagher's High Flying Birds, were played in soundchecks, but did not make any appearances at the band's actual concerts.

Midway during their performance of "Morning Glory" in Toronto, Ontario, Canada at the annual Virgin Festival, a man ran on stage and hit Noel on the back, knocking him to the ground. The band left the stage, but after five minutes, the show continued. It is unknown how the man got past security, although he was seen coming from backstage. A 47-year-old Canadian was charged with assault.
The incident sparked many well known media outlets all across the world, especially in North America, to report on the story.

Due to the injuries Noel sustained in the incident at the Virgin Festival, four concerts were postponed, including the 9 September show in London, Ontario, and the first three shows of the European leg. In addition, the 12 September concert in New York City was cancelled.

After the Toronto incident from early September, security for the rest of the 2008 shows cracked down to disposing personal belongings. After the start of the summer tour, it loosened up, noticeably at the Slane Castle shows where many thousands of people had passed security gates without being searched, urging many other people who had not paid to see the band attend as well.

The Wembley Arena, London (16 October) gig was broadcast live in the United Kingdom and Ireland on MTV One and on 24 October Oasis broke ticket sales for a single day in the UK selling over 500,000 tickets in 7 hours.

On 2 February Oasis performed in Milan, Italy in front of a crowd of 12,000 for the first time in more than three years. The Italian leg of the tour also included Rome, Treviso, Bolzano and Florence.

On 28 February, Oasis were informed by their Chinese promoters that the Chinese authorities that they had their performing licenses revoked and their gigs in Shanghai and Beijing cancelled. According to the promoters, the Chinese government had recently discovered that Noel Gallagher had performed at a Free Tibet Benefit Concert in New York in 1997, and on their MySpace page the band expressed disappointment and bewilderment at the decision.

On 1 April, Oasis performed at Seoul Olympic Stadium, 3 years after their last gig in Korea at 2006. The band met such a wild and passionate crowd that during the show Noel commented that he was "good to be back...you seem to have grown crazier." The crowd sang along with the band for almost all of the songs including those from Dig Out Your Soul. Throughout the concert, there were repeated requests for the band to play Live Forever. Noel played the song acoustic after the rest of the band left the stage because "somebody said people would be very upset if they didn't hear Live Forever. So this is special for Korean fans." This was a rare occasion for the band to play Live Forever live.

On 30 April, Oasis played their first gig on Lima, Peru selling out all the tickets at Estadio Nacional, playing for more than 48,000 fans and thus surprising the band, who later on said that it was one of the best shows and crowds on the tour. During an interview in Chile before the show in Santiago, Andy Bell alongside Gem Archer said that the Lima gig was possibly his favourite gig and the best they have ever done, saying that it was "really incredible".

On 3 May, Oasis played their fourth gig in Buenos Aires, Argentina. At the end of "Don't Look Back in Anger", Noel Gallagher got sentimental due to the accompaniment of the public towards him. Before "I Am the Walrus", the people started to sing "Live Forever" (this also happened in Lima), suggesting the brothers to play it. The band didn't accept and then continued with the final song. After that, Noel Gallagher said it was one of the best shows of his life. During interviews in early 2009, Noel had stated that this may be the last tour they will ever embark on or at least for several years due to growing older.

On 4 June 2009, Oasis played the first of three concerts at Manchester's Heaton Park and after having to leave the stage twice due to a generator failure, came on the third time to declare the gig was now a free concert, much to the delight of the 70,000 ticket holders inside the venue. Although in his diary entry he said the gig ended "in fuckin' shambles", he later admitted he still enjoyed himself under the circumstances. An estimated 20,000 fans had taken up the offer to receive a refund, to which Noel Gallagher had jokingly called them all 'Cheeky cunts!'

On 9 July 2009 at Wembley Stadium, Noel dedicated "Live Forever" to the lead singer of The Verve, Richard Ashcroft, who was in the crowd watching the show. Also on 9 July 2009 at Wembley Stadium, Oasis suffered yet another sound problem whilst playing their hit song "Wonderwall" towards the end, but fans at the show were able to sing along and help the band finish of the song in one piece. On 11 July 2009 with the rain pouring at Wembley Noel played the guitar to Don't Look Back in Anger and didn't sing a word and the whole crowd sang it back to him, he gave the crowd a round of applause at the end of the song.

On 20 August, at 'The Spa', Bridlington. Yorkshire, Oasis played what seemed to be their last ever gig. The show was watched by under 3000 people, having been hosted in such a small venue. The gig was described as "colossal" and "Very Intimate" by a small number of fans, who were greeted by members of the band, Liam Gallagher, Gem Archer, Andy Bell, Chris Sharrock and Jay Darlington, who were signing autographs and allowing pictures to be taken with their fans, outside the venue bar shortly after the gig. Fans were allowed to look inside the Oasis tour bus briefly, moments after Liam Gallagher offered a fan his half drunk beer. Noel Gallagher, however, had disappeared moments after the end of the gig, due to the increasing sibling fall-outs of which the Gallagher's were experiencing.

On 23 August 2009, The band pulled out of their headlining slot at V Festival in Chelmsford. The official reason given was that Liam was suffering with laryngitis, but rumours started speculating that a split was imminent. This makes the V Festival slot at Weston Park, Stafford on 22 August 2009 as the last Oasis gig. This marked the end of Oasis. On 28 August 2009, Noel admitted he could no longer work with Liam, and that the tour & the band was now finished.

Support acts

Cachorro Grande
Caesars
Cornershop
Detroit Social Club
Estelares
Everlaunch
Free Peace
Glasvegas
Howard Eliott Payne (7–10 November 2008)
Kasabian
Los Tipitos
Matt Costa
Primavera de Praga
Reverend and The Makers
Ryan Adams
Sergeant
The Blizzards
The Cardinals
The Enemy
The Floor Is Made of Lava
The Peth
The Prodigy
The Secret Machines
The Sixteen Tonnes
The Soundtrack of our Lives
Tomte
Travis
Turbopotamos
Twisted Wheel

Set list
This set list is representative of the performance on 11 July 2009 in London, England. It does not represent all concerts for the duration of the tour.

"Rock 'n' Roll Star"
"Lyla"
"The Shock of the Lightning"
"Cigarettes & Alcohol"
"Roll with It"
"To Be Where There's Life"
"Waiting for the Rapture"
"The Masterplan"
"Songbird"
"Slide Away"
"Morning Glory"
"My Big Mouth"
"The Importance of Being Idle"
"Half the World Away"
"I'm Outta Time"
"Wonderwall"
"Supersonic"
"Live Forever"
Encore
"Don't Look Back in Anger"
"Falling Down"
"Champagne Supernova"
"I Am the Walrus"

Other songs performed:
"The Meaning of Soul"
"Ain't Got Nothin'"
Whatever"

Shows

Cancelled shows

Notes

References

Oasis (band) concert tours
2008 concert tours
2009 concert tours